Pella is a department or commune of Boulkiemdé Province in central Burkina Faso. As of 2005 it has a population of 19,563. Its capital lies at the town of Pella.

Towns and villages
PellaBabouliDaboalaGoalaGodoKandagaKirguiloungaNabziniguimaPelbilinSaranaSomassi

References

Departments of Burkina Faso
Boulkiemdé Province